The 2004–05 Copa Federación de España was the 12th staging of the Copa Federación de España, a knockout competition for Spanish football clubs in Segunda División B and Tercera División.

The competition began in August 2005 with the Regional stages and ended with the finals on 13 and 27 April 2005.

Autonomous Communities tournaments

Asturias tournament

Qualifying tournament

Group A

Group B

Group C

Group D

Semifinals

|}

Final

|}

Castile and León tournament

Final

|}

Navarre tournament

|}

National tournament

National Qualifying round

|}

Round of 16

|}

Quarter-finals

|}

Semifinals

|}

Final

|}

References
2000–2009 Copa Federación results
Asturias tournament results

Copa Federación de España seasons